The Sony Ericsson W760 is a slider model music phone. It includes many of the same features found in Sony Ericsson's line of Walkman branded music phones, although also includes GPS navigation, shake/tilt sensors, and Sony's 'SensMe' music feature built in.

The W760 is available in three different colours marketed as "Fancy Red", "Intense Black" and "Rocky Silver". Included in certain retail configurations are a 1 GB or 2 GB capacity memory card. As well as the Walkman digital music player, the W760 can also play FM radio with features using RDS and GraceNote TrackID service.

The W760a model is for the USA regions, being offered by AT&T Wireless with the carrier's services.

References 
 Sony Ericsson W760 product page
 CNet Review

W760
Mobile phones introduced in 2008